Cinderella Meets Fella is a 1938 Warner Bros. Merrie Melodies directed by Tex Avery and written by Tedd Pierce. The short was released on July 23, 1938 and features the third appearance of an early version of Elmer Fudd.

Plot
The story starts out as normal, but Cinderella notices the Fairy Godmother is gone, so she calls the police, who find her in a bar. After some of Fairy Godmother's mixed up magic, Cinderella gets to the ball and finds Prince Charming (a.k.a. Elmer). They dance and have fun. The story continues as normal and when Prince Charming goes to Cinderella's house to return her glass slipper, he finds out she got tired of waiting and that she's in the third row of a "Warner Bros. picture show". Prince Charming cries until he finds out that Cinderella comes back and then they head off together to the tenth row.

Reception
Animation historian Greg Ford writes, "Cinderella certifies Avery's standing as a modernist in its distanced refurbishing of the hoary old Cinderella narrative."

Voice cast
Mel Blanc as Cuckoo Clock, Cops, Singing Palace Guard, Cinderella (screaming sounds)
Bernice Hansen as Cinderella
Danny Webb as Elmer Fudd, Singing Palace Guard, Lone Ranger Announcer
Elvia Allman as Ugly Sister, Fairy Godmother
Tex Avery as Police Radio Voice, Palace Guard, "Baby!"
Tedd Pierce as Prince: "Baby!"

References

External links

1938 films
Merrie Melodies short films
Warner Bros. Cartoons animated short films
Films based on Charles Perrault's Cinderella
Films directed by Tex Avery
American parody films
Fairy tale parody films
Elmer Fudd films
1938 animated films
Films scored by Carl Stalling
1930s Warner Bros. animated short films
1930s English-language films